Edmund Spence Root (December 27, 1881 – February 27, 1961) was a United States Navy Captain who served as the 34th Naval Governor of Guam. He graduated from the United States Naval Academy in 1905, serving on many ships as an ensign. He served during World War I as commander of the U-boat hunting , for which he received a letter of commendation. As governor, he generated controversy by expelling 112 Japanese laborers from Guam. The Guam Museum also opened during his term of office.

Early life 
On December 27, 1882, Root was born in Delaware, Ohio. Root's parents were George Root and Lori Spence.

Career

Naval 
Root was appointed to the United States Naval Academy from Ohio in 1901. He reported aboard  in 1906, and 1908 he served aboard  as an ensign. On April 4, 1910, he began service aboard .

In 1913, he served aboard . During World War I, Root served within the Bureau of Navigation and then with the destroyer fleet stationed out of Queenstown, Ireland. In the war, he commanded , specifically seeking out and engaging German U-boats, for which he received a letter of commendation. On May 28, 1919, Root set sail aboard  as her first commanding officer. In the 1940s, he headed the naval officer procurement program in Chicago, where he oversaw the area's initial WAVES program.

Governorship 
Root served as Naval Governor of Guam from May 15, 1931 to June 21, 1933. Root caused controversy between the United States and Japanese governments in 1933 when he expelled 112 Japanese citizens from Guam after their residence permits expired. The Guam Museum opened during his term. The Edmund S. Root Agricultural School in Guam is named in his honor.

Personal life 
On May 27, 1929 Root married La Mira D. Norton in Hempstead, New York. On February 27, 1961, Root died in San Diego, California.

References

External links 
 Edmund Spence Root at findagrave.com
 Edmund Spence Root at ourcampaigns.com

1881 births
1961 deaths
Governors of Guam
People from San Diego
United States Naval Academy alumni
United States Navy personnel of World War I
Military personnel from Ohio
United States Navy captains
WAVES (Navy)
Military personnel from California